The Canadian Hot 100 is a music industry record chart in Canada for songs, published weekly by Billboard magazine. The Canadian Hot 100 was launched on the issue dated March 31, 2007, and is currently the standard record chart in Canada; a new chart is compiled and officially released to the public by Billboard on Tuesdays but post-dated to the following Saturday.

The chart is similar to Billboards US-based Hot 100 in that it combines physical and digital sales as measured by Nielsen SoundScan, streaming activity data provided by online music sources, and radio airplay as measured by Broadcast Data Systems. Canada's radio airplay is the result of monitoring more than 100 stations representing rock, country, adult contemporary and Top 40 genres.

The first number-one song of the Canadian Hot 100 was "Girlfriend" by Avril Lavigne on March 31, 2007. As of the issue for the week ending March 18, 2023, the Canadian Hot 100 has had 189 different number-one songs. The current number-one song is "Flowers" by Miley Cyrus.

History
The chart was launched on the issue dated March 31, 2007 and was made available for the first time via Billboard online services on June 7, 2007. With this launch, it marked the first time that Billboard created a Hot 100 chart for a country outside the United States. 

Billboard charts manager Geoff Mayfield announced the premiere of the chart, explaining "the new Billboard Canadian Hot 100 will serve as the definitive measure of Canada's most popular songs, continuing our magazine's longstanding tradition of using the most comprehensive resources available to provide the world's most authoritative music charts."

The Billboard Canadian Hot 100 is managed by Paul Tuch, director of Canadian operations for Nielsen BDS, in consultation with Silvio Pietroluongo, Billboards associate director of charts and manager of the Billboard Hot 100.

Song achievements

Songs with most weeks at number one
19 weeks
 Lil Nas X featuring Billy Ray Cyrus – "Old Town Road" (2019)
18 weeks
 Harry Styles – "As It Was" (2022)
16 weeks
 The Black Eyed Peas – "I Gotta Feeling" (2009)
 Ed Sheeran – "Shape of You" (2017)
 Luis Fonsi and Daddy Yankee featuring Justin Bieber – "Despacito" (2017)
15 weeks
 Mark Ronson featuring Bruno Mars – "Uptown Funk" (2015)
13 weeks
 Timbaland featuring OneRepublic – "Apologize" (2007–08)
 Robin Thicke featuring T.I. and Pharrell Williams – "Blurred Lines" (2013)
 The Chainsmokers featuring Halsey – "Closer" (2016)
12 weeks
 The Kid Laroi and Justin Bieber – "Stay" (2021)
 Elton John and Dua Lipa – "Cold Heart (Pnau remix)" (2022)
11 weeks
 Rihanna featuring Calvin Harris – "We Found Love" (2011–12)
 OMI – "Cheerleader" (2015)
 24kGoldn featuring Iann Dior – "Mood" (2020–21)
10 weeks
 Maroon 5 featuring Christina Aguilera – "Moves like Jagger" (2011)
 Pharrell Williams – "Happy" (2014)
 Drake – "God's Plan" (2018)
 Maroon 5 featuring Cardi B – "Girls Like You" (2018)
 Roddy Ricch – "The Box" (2020)

Number-one debuts
 Eminem, Dr. Dre and 50 Cent – "Crack a Bottle" (February 21, 2009)
 Taylor Swift – "Today Was a Fairytale" (February 20, 2010)
 Young Artists for Haiti – "Wavin' Flag" (March 27, 2010)
 Eminem – "Not Afraid" (May 22, 2010)
 Katy Perry featuring Snoop Dogg – "California Gurls" (May 29, 2010)
 Britney Spears – "Hold It Against Me" (January 29, 2011)
 Lady Gaga – "Born This Way" (February 26, 2011)
 Katy Perry – "Part of Me" (March 3, 2012)
 Justin Bieber – "Boyfriend" (April 14, 2012)
 Taylor Swift – "We Are Never Ever Getting Back Together" (September 1, 2012)
 Katy Perry – "Roar" (August 31, 2013)
 Eminem featuring Rihanna – "The Monster" (November 16, 2013)
 Taylor Swift – "Shake It Off" (September 6, 2014)
 Justin Bieber – "What Do You Mean?" (September 19, 2015)
 Adele – "Hello" (November 14, 2015)
 Zayn – "Pillowtalk" (February 20, 2016)
 Major Lazer featuring Justin Bieber and MØ – "Cold Water" (August 13, 2016)
 Ed Sheeran – "Shape of You" (January 28, 2017)
 DJ Khaled featuring Justin Bieber, Quavo, Chance the Rapper and Lil Wayne – "I'm the One" (May 20, 2017)
 Taylor Swift – "Look What You Made Me Do" (September 16, 2017)
 Post Malone featuring 21 Savage – "Rockstar" (October 7, 2017)
 Drake – "God's Plan" (February 3, 2018)
 The Weeknd – "Call Out My Name" (April 14, 2018)
 Drake – "Nice for What" (April 21, 2018)
 Childish Gambino – "This Is America" (May 19, 2018)
 Maroon 5 featuring Cardi B – "Girls Like You" (June 16, 2018)
 Drake – "Nonstop" (July 14, 2018)
 Kanye West and Lil Pump – "I Love It" (September 22, 2018)
 Eminem – "Killshot" (September 29, 2018)
 Kodak Black featuring Travis Scott and Offset – "Zeze" (October 27, 2018)
 Ariana Grande – "Thank U, Next" (November 17, 2018)
 Ariana Grande – "7 Rings" (February 2, 2019)
 Jonas Brothers – "Sucker" (March 16, 2019)
 Billie Eilish – "Bad Guy" (April 13, 2019)
 Travis Scott – "Highest in the Room" (October 19, 2019)
 The Scotts, Travis Scott and Kid Cudi – "The Scotts" (May 9, 2020)
 Ariana Grande and Justin Bieber – "Stuck with U" (May 23, 2020)
 Lady Gaga and Ariana Grande – "Rain on Me" (June 6, 2020)
 DJ Khaled featuring Drake – "Popstar" (August 1, 2020)
 Cardi B featuring Megan Thee Stallion – "WAP" (August 22, 2020)
 Drake featuring Lil Durk – "Laugh Now Cry Later" (August 29, 2020)
 Justin Bieber featuring Chance the Rapper – "Holy" (October 3, 2020)
 Justin Bieber and Benny Blanco – "Lonely" (October 31, 2020)
 Ariana Grande – "Positions" (November 7, 2020)
 Shawn Mendes and Justin Bieber – "Monster" (December 5, 2020)
 Taylor Swift – "Willow" (December 26, 2020)
 Olivia Rodrigo – "Drivers License" (January 23, 2021)
 Lil Tjay featuring 6lack – "Calling My Phone" (February 27, 2021)
 Drake – "What's Next" (March 20, 2021)
 Justin Bieber featuring Daniel Caesar and Giveon – "Peaches" (April 3, 2021)
 Polo G – "Rapstar" (April 24, 2021)
 Olivia Rodrigo – "Good 4 U" (May 29, 2021)
 Ed Sheeran – "Bad Habits" (July 10, 2021)
 The Kid Laroi and Justin Bieber – "Stay" (July 24, 2021)
 Taylor Swift – "All Too Well (Taylor's Version)" (November 27, 2021)
 Harry Styles – "As It Was" (April 16, 2022)
 Jack Harlow – "First Class" (April 23, 2022)
 Drake featuring 21 Savage – "Jimmy Cooks" (July 2, 2022)
 Sam Smith and Kim Petras – "Unholy" (October 8, 2022)
 Taylor Swift – "Anti-Hero" (November 5, 2022)
 Drake and 21 Savage – "Rich Flex" (November 19, 2022)
 Metro Boomin, The Weeknd and 21 Savage – "Creepin'" (December 17, 2022)
 Miley Cyrus – "Flowers" (January 28, 2023)

Artists with the most number-one hits
 Justin Bieber – 13
 Rihanna – 11 (tie)
 Drake – 11 (tie) 
 Katy Perry – 10 
 Taylor Swift – 9
 The Weeknd – 7

Artists with the most weeks at number-one

 Justin Bieber – 56
 Rihanna – 46
 Drake – 39
 Katy Perry – 34 (tie)
 Maroon 5 – 34 (tie)
 The Black Eyed Peas – 32

Self-replacement at number-one
 The Black Eyed Peas – "Boom Boom Pow" → "I Gotta Feeling" (July 4, 2009)
 Taylor Swift – "Shake It Off" → "Blank Space" (November 29, 2014)
 Justin Bieber – "I'm the One" (DJ Khaled featuring Justin Bieber, Quavo, Chance the Rapper and Lil Wayne) → "Despacito" (Luis Fonsi and Daddy Yankee featuring Justin Bieber) (May 27, 2017)
 Drake – "Nonstop" → "In My Feelings" (July 21, 2018)

Other achievements
Justin Bieber holds the record as the artist with the most number one debuts in Canadian Hot 100 history, with 10.
Taylor Swift is the female artist with the most number one debuts, with 7.
 Teenage Dream by Katy Perry and Scorpion by Drake are the albums with most number-one singles (4 each).
 On the issue dated March 31, 2007, Avril Lavigne became the first Canadian act to top the Canadian Hot 100 with "Girlfriend".
 "Heat Waves" by Glass Animals holds the record for the longest stay on the chart (94 weeks).
 "Heat Waves" by Glass Animals had the longest climb to number one taking 64 weeks to reach that peak.
 On the issue dated February 27, 2010, Nikki Yanofsky became the youngest artist to top the Canadian Hot 100 at 16 years, 19 days old with the song "I Believe".
 On the issue dated October 6, 2012, "Gangnam Style" by Psy became the first non-English single to top the Canadian Hot 100. 
 On the issue dated June 27, 2009, The Black Eyed Peas became the first act to simultaneously occupy the top two positions with "Boom Boom Pow" at number one and "I Gotta Feeling" at number two.
 On the issue dated October 24, 2009, "3" by Britney Spears broke the record for the biggest jump to number one, leaping from number 86 to number one.
 On the issue dated October 31, 2015, The Weeknd's "The Hills" reached the top spot seven weeks after "Can't Feel My Face", becoming the first time in Canadian Hot 100 history that an album's lead single hit #1 after the second single did.
 In 2016, Justin Bieber became the first Canadian act to top the Year-End chart with "Sorry".
 On the issue dated January 28, 2017, Ed Sheeran became the first act to simultaneously debut at the top two positions with "Shape of You" at number one and "Castle on the Hill" at number two.
 On the issue dated July 14, 2018, Drake became the artist with the most simultaneously charting songs in a single week (27) and the most chart debuts in a week (22) on the Canadian Hot 100.
 On the issue dated January 12, 2019, "All I Want for Christmas Is You" by Mariah Carey had the biggest drop out of the Canadian Hot 100, dropping off from #1. On the issue dated January 14, 2023, "Rockin' Around the Christmas Tree" by Brenda Lee would also achieve this record.
 On the issue dated May 25, 2019, "I Don't Care" by Ed Sheeran and Justin Bieber jumped 90 spots to number 2, becoming the biggest single-week jump on the Canadian Hot 100's history.
 "All I Want for Christmas Is You" by Mariah Carey holds the record for largest gap between turns at #1, falling from the position on the week ending January 12, 2019 and returning the week ending January 4, 2020, a 51-week gap.
 On the issue dated November 5, 2022, Taylor Swift became the first artist to occupy the Canadian Hot 100's entire top 10.

See also
 Canadian Albums Chart
 List of artists who reached number one on the Canadian Hot 100
 List of number-one singles (Canada)

References

External links
 Current Canadian Hot 100

Billboard charts
Canadian record charts